Brendan Dolan (born 30 November 1966) is an Irish rower. He competed in the men's lightweight double sculls event at the 1996 Summer Olympics.

References

External links
 

1966 births
Living people
Irish male rowers
Olympic rowers of Ireland
Rowers at the 1996 Summer Olympics
Sportspeople from Dublin (city)
20th-century Irish people